I basilischi (also known as The Basilisks and The Lizards) is a 1963 Italian drama film. It is the directorial debut of Lina Wertmüller.

It was shown as part of a retrospective "Questi fantasmi: Cinema italiano ritrovato" at the 65th Venice International Film Festival.

Cast 
 Antonio Petruzzi as Tony
 Stefano Satta Flores as Francesco
 Sergio Ferrarino as  Sergio
 Luigi Barbieri as  Antonio's father
 Flora Carabella as  Luciana Bonfanti

References

External links

1963 films
Italian drama films
Films scored by Ennio Morricone
Films directed by Lina Wertmüller
1963 drama films
Social realism in film
Films set in Basilicata
1963 directorial debut films
1960s Italian films